2008–09 Országos Bajnokság I (men's water polo) (known as the Vodafone férfi OB I osztályú Országos Bajnokság for sponsorship reasons) was the 103rd water polo championship in Hungary.

First stage 

Pld - Played; W - Won; L - Lost; G+ - Points for; G- - Points against; Diff - Difference; P - Points.

Championship Playoff

Final
1st leg

2nd leg

3rd leg

4th leg

TEVA-VasasPlaket won the FINAL series 3–1.

European competition Playoff 

Pld - Played; W - Won; L - Lost; G+ - Points for; G- - Points against; Diff - Difference; P - Points; BP - Bonus Points.

Relegation Playoff 

Pld - Played; W - Won; L - Lost; G+ - Points for; G- - Points against; Diff - Difference; P - Points; Bp - Bonus Points.

Final standing

Sources 
Magyar sportévkönyv 2010

Seasons in Hungarian water polo competitions
Hungary
2008 in water polo
2008 in Hungarian sport
2009 in water polo
2009 in Hungarian sport